The Ministry of Agriculture and Rural Development of Israel (Misrad HaHakla'ut UFitu'ah HaKfar) is the ministry of the Israeli government that oversees the country's agricultural industry. The ministry was originally called Ministry of Agriculture, but in 1992 the title was changed to its current form. The Development Ministry, which oversaw rural development, was abolished in 1974.

List of ministers
The Agriculture and Rural Development Minister (Sar HaHakla'ut vePituah HaKfar) is the political head of the ministry, considered a relatively minor position in the Israel cabinet.  Two serving Prime Ministers, Menachem Begin and Ehud Barak, also served as agriculture ministers; Begin following the death of the incumbent, and Barak following the resignation of the former minister's party from his coalition. There is occasionally a Deputy Minister of Agriculture.

Deputy ministers

Units

 Plant Protection and Inspection Services

Insurance
Agricultural insurance in the country is provided by KANAT, the Insurance Fund for Natural Risks in Agriculture. It is jointly owned by the government and the farm marketing boards, and overseen by the Ministry. The KANAT Award is given for agricultural research.

References

External links

All Ministers in the Ministry of Agriculture Knesset website

Agriculture
Ministry of Agriculture
Agriculture
 
Agriculture in Israel
 
Israel